is a Japanese manga artist, author of My Lesbian Experience With Loneliness.

Nagata has been drawing for as long as she can remember. However, she did not start reading manga until 4th grade with Takehiko Inoue's sports manga Slam Dunk. She subsequently started reading other Weekly Shōnen Jump manga series, naming Nobuhiro Watsuki's samurai manga Rurouni Kenshin as her favourite in middle school.

Works

My Lesbian Experience with Loneliness

Nagata published My Lesbian Experience With Loneliness first on the Japanese website Pixiv before its revised version was released as a printed volume in 2016. This autobiographical manga deals with Nagata's mental health issues and her homosexuality. It established Nagata's trademark visual style of black and white drawings with pink screentones.

My Solo Exchange Diary
The sequel to My Lesbian Experience With Loneliness, My Solo Exchange Diary (Japanese: 一人交換日記, Hitori kōkan nikki), was published in Japanese later in the same year, 2016, and in English in 2018. While continuing to explore the themes of My Lesbian Experience With Loneliness, My Solo Exchange Diary is based on the concept of diary entries or letters that Nagata exchanges with her former and future self. Its second volume, titled My Solo Exchange Diary 2 (一人交換日記2) was released in Japanese in 2017 and in English in 2019.

My Alcoholic Escape from Reality
My Alcoholic Escape from Reality (現実逃避してたらボロボロになった話, Genjitsu tōhi shitetara boroboro ni natta hanashi, literally "a story of coming apart when I escaped from reality") deals with Nagata's alcoholism and subsequent hospitalization for pancreatitis. The manga was released in Japan in 2019 and in the United States of America in 2021.

My Wandering Warrior Existence
My Wandering Warrior Existence (迷走戦士・永田カビ, Meisou Senshi Nagata Kabi) is the fifth and latest installment in the series of Nagata's autobiographical manga. It interrogates Nagata's longings for love and marriage. The manga was released in Japanese in 2020 and in English in 2022.

Awards
In 2018, Nagata's My Lesbian Experience With Loneliness won both the Harvey Award for Best Manga and the Crunchyroll Anime Award for Best Manga.

References

1987 births
Living people
Harvey Award winners
LGBT comics creators
Japanese lesbian artists
Manga artists
Japanese female comics artists
Women manga artists
21st-century pseudonymous writers
Pseudonymous women writers